As of 2019, there are 632 parks in Chennai City, including 142 parks in the north zone, 224 in the central zone, and 266 in the south zone. They range in size from 700 square metres to 5,000 square metres. A couple of the parks, including the Anna Nagar Tower Park, are spread across acres. In 2018, the city's green cover was estimated to be 14.9 percent, up from an estimated 4.5 percent in 2011. The per capita green cover of the city has been estimated at 8.5 square meters, as against the World Health Organization recommendation of 9 square meters of green cover per capita in cities. The city lost around 100,000 trees in December 2016 because of Cyclone Vardah. As of 2018, the city's tree cover is estimated to be around 64.06 sq km. This is just over 15 percent of the entire city. The most dominant species of trees in the city are copper pod, Indian beech, neem, gulmohar, raintree, and tropical almond. The overall extent of open space in the city is 34.58 km2. In all, the city has 121 species of trees belonging to 94 genera and 42 families. Teynampet zone remains the most diverse with 68 species, and Manali zone with just 38 species is the least. With 51 parks, Adyar remains the zone with the highest number of parks in the city, and Tiruvottiyur zone scores the least with only 4 parks. The share of Chennai's greenspace is dominated by the Guindy National Park, with an area of 2.71 sq km, which covers a vast area south of the Adyar River.

As of December 2014, the city had about 396 parks. Until 2011, the seven zones of the old corporation limits had about 260 public parks, 154 traffic islands and 103 centre median parks, maintained by the parks department of the Corporation of Chennai, many of which suffer poor maintenance. Public parks include 88 notified parks, 73 park sites in extended areas, and more than 100 open spaces that have been earmarked for recreation purposes. The eight zones in the newly added areas of the city have about 265 locations that have been identified for development of new parks. The largest among the parks in the city is the 358-acre Tholkappia Poonga, developed to restore the fragile ecosystem of the Adyar estuary.

Chennai's greenspace is further augmented by a network of open spaces containing forests, prairies, wetlands, canals, streams, and lakes that are set aside as natural areas along the city's periphery.

In pre-Independence days, the ceiling on the number of permanent workers for maintenance of city parks was fixed at 350. This has not been revised till date.

Water requirement
The average amount of water required to maintain the parks in the city is 5 litres per square metre, which averages to about 5,000 litres per park.

Increase in numbers
Until 2011, there had been 260 parks in the city. In the following year, 200 new parks were proposed. Eighty-seven of these were opened in January 2014 and the rest are nearing completion as of July 2014. By December 2014, there were about 396 parks in the city.

In July 2014, the Chennai Corporation identified more than 440 open space reserves (OSR) to create 100 new parks in the city. The Corporation hopes to have at least 560 parks in the city by March 2015. However, this number would still remain way lower than that of Delhi (1,500), Mumbai (1,300), Bangalore (721) and Hyderabad, India (709).

List of parks

 Anna Nagar Tower Park, 
 Dr. Annie Besant Park
 Arignar Anna Zoological Park, 
 Ashok Nagar Park
 Bogun Villa Park
 BPC Park
 Chennai Corporation Park, Periyar Nagar, Perambur
 Chetput Aeri Park, 
 G Block Park
 Gandhi Park
 Gill Nagar Park
 Guindy National Park, 700 acres
 Kodambakkam High Road Park
 Haddows Road Park
 Independence Day Park
 Indira Nagar Park
 Jeeva Park
 Jeeva Park, Ayanavaram
 Journalist Colony Park
 Kalaignar Karunanidhi Park
 Kennedy Square Park, Perambur
 KKR Avenue Park, Perambur
 Labour Colony Park
 Maadi Poonga
 Madhavaram Botanical Garden, 
 Manali Lakeside Park
 Mathur MMDA Park, 
 May Day Park, 
 Mayor Sundararao Park
 Mugaliwakkam Park,  (0.52 hectares)
 My Ladye's Park
 Nageshwara Rao Park, 
 Natesan Park, 
 Nehru Park
 Nesapakkam Park
 Panagal Park, 
 People's Park
 Perambur Flyover Park
 Rajiv Gandhi Park, Mettupalayam, Perambur
 Sathyavani Muthu Nagar Park
 Secretariat Colony Park
 Secretariat Park, 
 Semmoli Poonga, 
 Shenoy Nagar Park, 
 Sivan Park
 Surya Narayana Park
 Thiru Nagar Park
 Thiru Vi Ka Park, 
 Thiruvalluvar Park, Velachery
 Tholkappia Poonga, 358 acres
 Tiruvallurvar Nagar First Avenue Park
 Turn Bulls Road Park
 Valluvar Kottam Park
 Vasuki Park, Kodungaiyur
 Venus Park, Paper Mills road, Gopal colony, Perambur.

See also

 Geography of Chennai

References

External links
 Homepage of Corporation of Chennai

 
Chennai
Parks
Chennai
Chennai